Bertalan Hajtós (born 28 September 1965 in Miskolc) is a Hungarian judoka. He competed at the 1988, 1992 and the 1996 Summer Olympics.

Achievements

References

External links
 

1965 births
Living people
Hungarian male judoka
Judoka at the 1988 Summer Olympics
Judoka at the 1992 Summer Olympics
Judoka at the 1996 Summer Olympics
Olympic judoka of Hungary
Olympic silver medalists for Hungary
Olympic medalists in judo
Medalists at the 1992 Summer Olympics
Goodwill Games medalists in judo
Sportspeople from Miskolc
Competitors at the 1990 Goodwill Games
20th-century Hungarian people